Jasjeet "Jas" Singh Sekhon is a data scientist, political scientist, and statistician at Yale University. Sekhon is the Eugene Meyer Professor of Political Science and Statistics and Data Science at Yale University, a fellow of the American Statistical Association, and a fellow of the Society for Political Methodology. Sekhon's primary research interests lie in causal inference, machine learning, and their intersection. He has also published research on their application to American voting behavior.

Biography
Sekhon graduated with a B.A. from the University of British Columbia. In 1999, he earned a Ph.D. at Cornell University.

Sekhon's career in academia began in 1999, when he became an assistant professor at Harvard University. He stayed at Harvard until 2005 when he moved to UC Berkeley. At Berkeley, he was appointed as the Robson Professor of Political Science and Statistics in 2014. In 2019, he accepted a non-academic position as Head of Advanced Data Science at Bridgewater Associates, and in 2020 left Berkeley to join Yale University, where he was appointed Meyer Professor of Political Science and Statistics and Data Science in 2021. He was named a fellow of the Society for Political Methodology in 2019 and a fellow of the American Statistical Association in 2021.

Sekhon has authored or co-authored dozens of journal articles and several widely used R packages. The topics of his scholarship include experimental research methods, machine learning for estimating causal effects, election fraud, and matching. His research has been widely cited.

Research
Sekhon is best known for his research in causal inference and machine learning. His early research on causal inference focused on the role of matching, but he later wrote an article pointing out that matching is unable to address many of the problems (particularly the selection on observables assumption) that its proponents assume. Nevertheless, his Genetic Matching algorithm remains one of his most highly cited articles. As of 2021, his research focuses on developing interpretable and credible machine learning methods for estimating causal relationships.

One of Sekhon's first publications, a journal article in Digestive Diseases and Sciences, presented a novel treatment, glucocorticoid, for a rare disease that he suffered. Sekhon himself was the first case described in the article.

Selected publications

References

Fellows of the American Statistical Association
American political scientists
American statisticians
Yale University faculty
Year of birth missing (living people)
Living people
Cornell University alumni